This is a list of television shows set in the Seattle area:



0-9
The 4400 (2004–2007)

A
 Almost Live! (1984-1999) (Aired on Comedy Central 1992-1993)
Aqua Unit Patrol Squad 1 (series run: 2000–present; years set in Seattle: 2011–present)

B
Becky and Bender

C
 Crowded (2016)
 Colony (2016)

D
Dark Angel (2000–2002, set in an apocalyptic future Seattle after an electromagnetic pulse)
Davis Rules (1991-1992) set outside Seattle. (Jonathan Winters, Randy Quaid & Bonnie Hunt)
Dead Like Me (2003–2004, almost none of the show was filmed in Seattle or showed recognizable locations)
The Diary of Ellen Rimbauer (2003 miniseries)
Dirk Gently's Holistic Detective Agency (2016 TV series) 
Domestic Life (1984 Sitcom)
Dumb & Dumber (A 1995 episode of the short-lived animated series entitled "Senseless in Seattle" took place in the city, most notably in the Space Needle)

F
Frasier (1993–2004, set in contemporary Seattle.  One episode shot on location in Seattle.)

G
Grey's Anatomy (2005–present)

H
Here Come the Brides (1968–1970, set in Seattle in the early years of settlement)

I
iCarly (2007–2012)
iCarly (2021–present)
Imposters (2017–2018)
Intruders (2014)
iZombie (2015–2019)
The Immaculate Conception of Little Dizzle

J
John Doe (2002)

K
The Killing (2011)
Kyle XY (2006–2009)

L
Life As We Know It (2004)
Life Sucks (TBA)
Loudermilk (2017–present)

M
Medicine Ball (1995)
Millennium (1996–1999)
Mr. & Mrs. Smith (1996)

N
Night Stalker (TV series) (2005)
The Night Strangler (1973, TV movie)
No Tomorrow (2016)

O
Once Upon a Time (2017)
Once Upon a Time (season 7) (2017)

P

R
Reaper (2007–2009)
Rose Red (2002 miniseries)

S
Second Chance (2016 TV series) (2016)
Shooter (2016-2018)
Six Feet Under (2001–2005), episode "Driving Mr Mossback"
Station 19 (2018-present)
Seatle Firefighters

T
Almost Home (1993)
Traffic (2004 miniseries)
Travelers (2016-2019)
Twin Peaks (1990–1991 TV series and 1992 movie, set in northeast Washington, was filmed in the towns of North Bend and Snoqualmie, about a half-hour outside of Seattle.  Seattle is referenced a few times in the series.)
True Justice - starring Steven Seagal

U
Under One Roof (1995)

V
Van Helsing (2016)

W
Weeds (TV series)

Y
A Year in the Life (1986–87)
Your Family or Mine (2015)

Miniseries, specials or individual episodes
Phineas and Ferb
"Phineas and Ferb Summer Belongs to You!"
"Phineas And Ferb: The Chronicles Of Meap: Meapless In Seattle"

References

Seattle
Culture of Seattle